Bair Shigaev is a Russian paralympic archer. He competed at the 2020 Summer Paralympics in the archery competition, winning the bronze medal in the mixed team compound event on open class with his teammate, Stepanida Artakhinova. Shigaev also competed at the 2022 World Para Archery Championships.

References 

Living people
Place of birth missing (living people)
Year of birth missing (living people)
Russian male archers
Archers at the 2020 Summer Paralympics
Medalists at the 2020 Summer Paralympics
Paralympic medalists in archery
Paralympic archers of Russia
Paralympic bronze medalists for Russia
21st-century Russian people